Temitope Ayoluwa "Tope" Obadeyi (born 29 October 1989) is an English professional footballer who plays as a winger for Gloucester City. Obadeyi has previously played for Bolton Wanderers, Swindon Town, Rochdale, Shrewsbury Town, Chesterfield, Rio Ave, Bury, Plymouth Argyle, Kilmarnock, Dundee United and Sochaux.

Early life
Obadeyi was born in Birmingham, West Midlands and is of Nigerian descent. During his time at Four Dwellings High School in Birmingham, Obadeyi's strike partner was Daniel Sturridge and the two were reunited in February 2011 when the latter moved to Bolton on loan from Chelsea for the remainder of the season.

Career
Obadeyi made his first team debut for Bolton as a substitute in the club's 0–1 home Premier League defeat by Wigan on 28 December 2008. In August 2009, Obadeyi signed for Swindon Town on a one-month loan and scored his first goal in a 2–1 victory over Southend United on 29 August. On 11 September his loan was extended by another month, and again on 15 October for a final month under the 93-day emergency loan limit.
In January 2010, Obadeyi went on loan again, this time to Rochdale for the rest of the season. He scored his first goal for Rochdale against Dagenham & Redbridge on 20 February 2010. The third loan of his career was made on 22 October 2010 when he joined Shrewsbury Town on an initial one-month loan. On 24 November, the loan was extended until 8 January 2011, but following the end of that period, the club decided not to extend it any further.

On 7 July 2011, Obadeyi signed a one-year extension to his contract at Bolton, and on 8 November joined League One team Chesterfield on loan until 26 December, making his debut the following day in a 4–3 win over Tranmere Rovers in the Football League Trophy. Obadeyi made his league debut for Chesterfield on 19 November in the 5–2 loss away to Oldham Athletic and made six appearances overall before returning to Bolton. On 14 March 2012 he began a second loan spell at Rochdale. The loan lasted a month and he scored once. However, at the end of the 2011–12 season, following Bolton's relegation from the Premier League, Obadeyi was released and subsequently joined Rio Ave at the start of June 2012.

Obadeyi made 12 appearances in the Primeira Liga during the 2012–13 season without scoring as Rio Ave finished sixth in the league table. His one goal for the club came in December 2012 against Sporting CP in the Taça da Liga. Obadeyi left Rio Ave at the end of the campaign.

He signed a one-year contract with Bury in August 2013. He played in two league games and one cup tie before joining Plymouth Argyle on loan in November until January 2014. Obadeyi made ten appearances for the club in all competitions during the loan, which was interrupted by a hamstring injury, and scored one goal against York City. On 20 February 2014, Obadeyi joined Plymouth Argyle for a second loan spell with the Devon club. Obadeyi established himself as Argyle's preferred choice on the left side of midfield, before his loan expired. He was released by Bury at the end of the season,

Obadeyi signed a three-year contract with Scottish Premiership club Kilmarnock in July 2014. After two seasons with the club he signed for Scottish Championship club Dundee United in July 2016, joining on a one-year contract.

On 31 January 2017, Obadeyi joined League One club Oldham Athletic on a contract until the end of the 2016–17 season.

He was released by Oldham at the end of the 2017–18 season, following their relegation.

On 25 July 2018, Obadeyi signed with Ligue 2 club Sochaux on a two-year contract.
He left Sochaux in June 2020.

On 4 February 2022, Obadeyi rejoined Oldham Athletic on a short-term contract until the end of the 2021–22 season, the contract not extended following relegation.

Obadeyi signed for Ilkeston Town in October 2022. On 26 November 2022, Obadeyi joined National League North club Gloucester City.

Career statistics

Notes

References

External links

1989 births
Living people
Footballers from Birmingham, West Midlands
English footballers
England youth international footballers
Association football forwards
Coventry City F.C. players
Bolton Wanderers F.C. players
Swindon Town F.C. players
Rochdale A.F.C. players
Shrewsbury Town F.C. players
Chesterfield F.C. players
Rio Ave F.C. players
Bury F.C. players
Plymouth Argyle F.C. players
Kilmarnock F.C. players
Dundee United F.C. players
Oldham Athletic A.F.C. players
FC Sochaux-Montbéliard players
Ilkeston Town F.C. players
Gloucester City A.F.C. players
Premier League players
English Football League players
Ligue 2 players
Primeira Liga players
Southern Football League players
National League (English football) players
Scottish Professional Football League players
English people of Nigerian descent
English people of Yoruba descent
Yoruba sportspeople
English expatriate footballers
English expatriate sportspeople in France